is a Japanese anime television series produced by Nippon Animation which ran for 52 episodes on TV Tokyo from October 1992 to September 1993. It is based on the 1854 song "Jeanie with the Light Brown Hair" by Stephen Foster.

Outline
This work depicts the childhood of the composer Stephen Foster and his wife Jane McDowell Foster Wiley. The original is the novel based the biography of Stephen Foster, written by Fumio Ishimori. Among music-themed anime, this work is an anime whose theme is not only music but also biography, and depicts the childhood of a noted composer. However, the anime itself has almost nothing to do with the real Foster or his wife. It is one of companion volumes of the "World Masterpiece Theater", broadcast on TV Tokyo from 19:30 to 20:00 on Thursday.

This work is the last anime based on Western literatures which was produced by Nippon Animation. In fact, there are no anime based on Western literatures in anime that were first broadcast since 1993, except for Fuji TV's "World Masterpiece Theater" series. When this work was broadcast in Japan, Japan was in the midst of a J-League boom (opened on 15 May 1993). Contrary to the success of Brazilians who played in newly established J League, anime "seeing foreign countries from afar" like this work have fallen.

It can be said that this work "Jeanie with the light brown hair" heralded the end of "the era seeing foreign countries from afar", just as the predecessor "Moero! Top Striker" heralded the beginning of "the era when it is natural to play an active role overseas".

Synopsis
The story begins in a small town in Pennsylvania in 1838. Jeanie MacDowell is a cheerful and beautiful girl with light brown hair (although this could be perceived as being blonde hair). Jeanie enjoys playing the piano and loves taking piano lessons from her mother.

Steven, a good harmonica player, and Bill, a boy who is very good at playing the banjo, are great friends of Jeanie's. They enjoy playing music together like a small band.

However, Jeanie's happy life changes dramatically after her mother suddenly passes away. Experiencing many difficulties and learning the importance of life, she decides to devote her life to helping many people suffering from illness.

Characters 
 Narrator : Toshiko Fujita

Main trio 
 Jeanie MacDowell :
 Steven Foster :
 Bill :

Other characters 
 Freddie MacDowell :
Jeanie's father.
 Angela MacDowell :
Jeanie's mother.
 Dr. Sandy :
 Diana :
Jeanie's stepmother.
 Robert :
 Big Joe :
Bill's father.
 Mammy :
 Henry Foster :
 Susan :
 Ms. Garland :
An illiberal teacher.
 Betty Lambert :
 Cathy :
 Mora :
 Kanna :
 Sister Nancy Conrad :
 Dr. Jason :
 Jackson
 Carla
A snobbish student who dislikes Jeanie.

Animal characters 
 Tray
 Bill's domestic dog. It goes well with the Jeanie trio and can even save them from the crisis.

Staff
 Director : Ryō Yasumura
 Assistant director : Hiroshi Nishikiori
 Scenario : Fumio Ishimori, Nobuyuki Fujimoto, Mai Sunaga
 Character design : Masahiro Kase
 Music : Hideo Shimazu
 Sound director : Etsuji Yamada
 Animation director : Masahiro Kase, Hirokazu Ishiyuki, Ikuo Shimazu, Moriyasu Taniguchi, Satoshi Tasaki
 Art director : Masamichi Takano
 Producer : Mutsuo Shimizu (TV Tokyo), Takaji Matsudo, Shun'ichi Kosao (Nippon Animation)
 Planning : Shōji Satō (Nippon Animation), Masunosuke Ōhashi (Dentsu Osaka branch)
 Production management : Junzō Nakajima (Nippon Animation)
 Production desk : Ken'ichi Satō
 Copyright management : Tadashi Hoshino
 Public relations : Caroline Briey (TV Tokyo)

Theme songs
 Opening theme : 
 Singer : Mitsuko Horie
 Lyricist : Kazunori Sonobe
 Composer, arranger : Tomoki Hasegawa
 Ending theme : 
 Singer : Mitsuko Horie
 Lyricist : Mitsuko Shiramine
 Composer, arranger : Hideo Shimazu

The music collection of this work is titled as "Mirror of Memories," which is also the title of the ending theme, and occasionally inserts narrations by Mitsuko Horie who acts the main character Jeanie McDowell.

Episodes

Kinpatsu no Jeanie

During the civil war a girl living in Virginia, named Jeanie, waits for her old boyfriend Robert to marry him, according to a childish promise, but the war makes the things complicated and, Robert comes back as northerner soldier.
Only with the conflict's end, and many misadventures, their dream will become true.

Episode List

1 My First Love

2 A Meeting of Hearts

3 The Rose Pendant

4 A Long-Awaited Reunion

5 Mother's Secret

6 So Close Yet So Far

7 The Beginning of A New Road

8 A Kiss

9 Goodbye My Dear

10 A Bittersweet Birthday

11 Boy Wearing A Dress?

12 Days That Will Not Return

13 I Will Look To The Future

VIZ Blu-Ray DVD Region 1/A

| Part 1 | 1–28 | 
|-
| Part 2 | 29–52 | 
|-

International broadcast

Arabic Title: ابنتي العزيزة... راوية ("My Dear Daughter")
The series was broadcast in the Arab World on several Middle Eastern networks.

French Title: Le Rêve de Jeanie ("The Dream of Jeanie")
The series aired starting December 23, 1996, on French TV channel TF1, during the children's program Club Dorothée. Only 38 episodes out of the total 52 were aired on French television, leaving episodes 39–52 unreleased on television on France. The anime was never released on DVD in France, and only received a TV airing.

Italian Title: Fiocchi di Cotone per Jeanie ("Cotton Balls for Jeanie")
The series was broadcast in Italy on the private television channel Italia 1 in June 1994, where it was well received. It has since been released on DVD by Yamato Video with both the original Japanese audio and the Italian dub. The Italian version also had its own theme song, "Flakes of Cotton for Jeanie," performed by Cristina D'Avena. It has also been published on a streaming channel on YouTube under "Yamato Animation" by Italian anime distributor Yamato Video.
Spanish Title: Dulce Jana ("Sweet Jana")
The series was broadcast in Spain on the private television channel Telecinco in 1997, where it was well received.  The Spanish version also had its Italian theme song, "Sweet Jana," performed by Sol Pilas. 
 
Scandinavian Titles
Norwegian: Jeanie Med Det Lysebrune Håret.
The series was broadcast in Norway on NRK in September 1996.

Swedish: Jeanie Med Ljusbrunt Hår.
The series was broadcast in Sweden on SVT2 in August 1996

Danish: Jeanie Med Lysebrunt Hår.
The series was broadcast in Denmark on DR2 in May 1996

The anime was again being broadcast in all 3 countries in 1998 on the Scandinavian version of FOX Kids.

In Indonesia, it was broadcast on RCTI, Lativi, and Spacetoon in mid-2000s.

Notes and references

External links
  (official site)
 
  — an earlier television series based on the same source
 http://www.planete-jeunesse.com/fiche-426-le-reve-de-jeanie.html
 http://www.animeka.com/animes/detail/reve-de-jeannie.html
 http://www.antoniogenna.net/doppiaggio/anim/fiocchidicotoneperjeanie.htm
 https://www.youtube.com/watch?v=aRzgv2OE8mQ&list=PL8jk9jEnr_70Sq1v70ahGGFQ5-dHxhvrx

See also
 My Daddy Long Legs : Same as this work, an anime planned by Masunosuke Ōhashi and starring Mitsuko Horie. Broadcast on Fuji TV in 1990.
 Moero! Top Striker : One of companion volumes of "the World Masterpiece Theater" aired on TV Tokyo on Thursday, and is the predecessor of this work.

1992 anime television series debuts
Drama anime and manga
Historical anime and manga
Music in anime and manga
School life in anime and manga
Stephen Foster
TV Tokyo original programming